The 31st Massachusetts General Court, consisting of the Massachusetts Senate and the Massachusetts House of Representatives, met in 1810 and 1811 during the governorship of Elbridge Gerry. Harrison Gray Otis served as president of the Senate and Perez Morton served as speaker of the House.

Senators

Representatives

See also
 11th United States Congress
 12th United States Congress
 List of Massachusetts General Courts

References

External links
 . (Includes data for state senate and house elections in 1810)
 
 
 
 

Political history of Massachusetts
Massachusetts legislative sessions
massachusetts
1810 in Massachusetts
massachusetts
1811 in Massachusetts